Wundwasser is the fifth studio album by the German dark metal band Eisregen, released through Massacre Records in 2004.

Track listing
"Intro - Wahrheit ...?" – 0:30
"Mein Eichensarg" – 5:07
"Am Glockenseil" – 2:41
"Vom Muttermord" – 4:59
"Blutgeil" – 4:19
"Ripper von Rostow" – 3:27
"Hinein ins Tränenmeer" – 4:58
"Glas" – 4:23
"Was vom Leben übrig bleibt" – 4:33
"Kreuznarbe" – 4:09
"Wundwasser" – 5:19
"Outro - Ende ....?" – 0:19

Credits
 Michael "Blutkehle" Roth − vocals
 Michael "Bursche" Lenz − guitar
 Sebastian "Berg" Morbach − bass
 Theresa "2T" Trenks - violin
 Daniel "DF" Fröbing - keyboards
 Ronny "Yantit" Fimmel − drums

2004 albums
Eisregen albums
Massacre Records albums